Bewdley is a historic plantation house located near St. Stephens Church, King and Queen County, Virginia. It was built in the third quarter of the 18th century, and is a large two-story, "L"-shaped brick dwelling. It has a hipped roof with a 20th-century modillion cornice.  The front facade features an early 19th-century pedimented dwarf portico supported on four Tuscan order columns.

It was listed on the National Register of Historic Places in 1978.

References

Plantation houses in Virginia
Houses on the National Register of Historic Places in Virginia
Houses completed in 1760
Houses in King and Queen County, Virginia
National Register of Historic Places in King and Queen County, Virginia